Massello is a comune (municipality) in the Metropolitan City of Turin in the Italian region Piedmont, located about 50 km west of Turin, in the Valle Germanasca.

Massello borders the following municipalities: Pragelato, Roure, Fenestrelle, Perrero, and Salza di Pinerolo.

See also 
 Bric Ghinivert
 Monte Politri

References

Cities and towns in Piedmont